Siberian International Marathon (SIM) has been held in the city of Omsk since 1990, when the city was first opened to foreigners. The summer marathon is part of the City Days festivities. It takes place during the week of St. Ilya's Day, the patron saint of Omsk, in early August. The marathon itself takes place during the first Saturday of August. The winter half-marathon is during the January 7 Orthodox Christmas week.

The race date was moved forward a week in 2012 so that the start time exactly coincided with that of the 2012 Olympic men's marathon held in London. It was delayed until September in 2013 due to the 2013 World Championships in Athletics being held in Moscow during that period.

It was organised in 1990 by Dmitri Khodko and Sergei Govrilov as an attempt to open Omsk to foreigners. The foreign participation was headed by Claude Fisicaro, an Australian living in London, through a running club called World Runners, who ran in aid of ending hunger. Later directors of the Los Angeles Marathon and the New York City Marathon actively participated in the early years of the Siberian International Marathon. The first marathon was attended by 1800 athletes, including 32 foreigners from 9 countries one of which was British MP John Austin-Walker, and a Kenyan marathon runner who due to flight difficulty arrived the morning of the marathon. Since the early 1990s, the marathon has attracted thousands of participants (and many foreigners) each year and the number is growing annually.

It is designated as an IAAF Bronze Label Road Race, making it the only such competition in the country to hold IAAF status. In spite of its international nature, only one foreign athlete (Cosmas Musyoka of Kenya) topped the podium at the competition between 1990 and 2010.

The COVID-19 pandemic & Russian invasion of Ukraine caused the 2020 & 2022 races to go virtual, respectively.

Events
Currently, the events for the Siberian International Marathon include:
Marathon (42 km 195m - distance is certified by the AIMS). First 10 women and men receive monetary prizes.
Wheelchair marathon (42 km 195m). First 10 women and men receive monetary prizes.
Marathon relay (42 km 195m; 6 participants; legs of 5, 10, 5, 10, 5, and 7.195 kilometer). First 3 male and female teams receive monetary prizes.
Speedskating marathon (42 km 195m). Marathon on in-line skates. First 3 receive monetary prizes.

Past winners
NOTE: no race in 2020 nor 2022.

Key:

See also

References

List of winners
Podbelski, Konstantin & Loonstra, Klaas (2013-09-25). Siberian International Marathon. Association of Road Racing Statisticians. Retrieved on 2013-10-05.

External links
Official website

Sport in Omsk
Recurring sporting events established in 1990
Sport in Siberia
Marathons in Russia
Summer events in Russia